A number of ships have been named Cherokee, after the Native American tribe, including:

United States Navy
 , a blockade gunboat during the American Civil War
 , a steam yacht built in 1903 and commissioned as a patrol ship in the Atlantic during World War I 
 , built in 1891 but commissioned as a tug during World War I
 , a World War II era tug, later with the US Coast Guard

Royal Navy
 was the lead ship of the Cherokee-class brig-sloop. She saw service during the Napoleonic Wars. In 1810 she participated in an engagement that resulted in her crew qualifying for the Naval General Service Medal. The Navy sold Cherokee in 1828. She then became a merchantman trading between Liverpool and Africa. Chrokee was wrecked in August 1831 returning to England from Africa. 
, a paddle patrol vessel in service on the Canadian Great Lakes 
, an Albacore-class wooden screw gunboat

Merchant ships
, was a  passenger-cargo liner of the Atlantic, Gulf & West Indies Steamship Lines (AGWI), New York. A submarine torpedo sank her on 16 June 1942, with the loss of 86 lives, when she was north-east of Cape Cod while she was on a voyage from Halifax, Nova Scotia to Boston, Massachusetts.

Citations

Ship names
Cherokee in popular culture